Ralf-Reimar Wolfram (31 March 1912 – 9 February 1945) was a Korvettenkapitän during World War II. During his career he commanded two U-boats for a total of 118 days at sea spanning four patrols. Robert Gray was a straggler from  convoy HX 234 en route to Britain.

For Wolfram's fourth patrol, he commanded  during Operation Caesar. He was killed when U-864 was sunk by the British submarine . This was the only known instance of one submerged submarine sinking another submerged submarine. U-864 remains Wolfram's grave to this day.

References

Bibliography

External links
 Ralf-Reimar Wolfram

1912 births
1945 deaths
People from Wilhelmshaven
Kriegsmarine personnel killed in World War II
People from the Province of Hanover
U-boat commanders (Kriegsmarine)
Reichsmarine personnel
People lost at sea
Military personnel from Lower Saxony